Electoral Palace or Elector's Palace may refer to any of the palaces of one of the German Holy Roman Empire's Prince-electors:

 Electoral Palace, Amberg, of the Elector of the Palatinate at Amberg
 Electoral Palace, Bonn, of the Archbishops and Electors of Cologne at Bonn
 Electoral Palace, Koblenz, of the last Archbishop and Elector of Trier at Koblenz
 Electoral Palace, Mainz, of the Archbishops and Electors of Mainz
 Heidelberg Castle, the ruined Electoral Palace of the Electors Palatine of the Rhine at Heidelberg
 Mannheim Palace, the main residence of the Electors Palatine of the Rhine at Mannheim
 Schloss Johannisburg, an Electoral Palace of the Archbishops and Electors of Mainz at Aschaffenburg

See also  
 Bishop's Palace (disambiguation) 
 List of castles in Germany